The Malta Independent is a national newspaper published daily in Malta. It was started in 1992. The paper publishes an online version branded as Malta Independent Online.

References

External links
 Official Website

1992 establishments in Malta
English-language newspapers published in Europe
Newspapers published in Malta
Maltese news websites
Publications established in 1992